In the United Kingdom, the minister without portfolio is often a cabinet position, and is sometimes used to enable people such as the Chairman of the Conservative Party or the Chair of the Labour Party to attend cabinet meetings (if so, they hold the title of "Party chairman"). The sinecure positions of Lord Privy Seal, Paymaster General, and Chancellor of the Duchy of Lancaster which have few responsibilities and have a higher rank in the Order of Precedence than Minister without Portfolio can also be used to similar effect. The office is currently held by Greg Hands.

The corresponding shadow minister is the Shadow Minister without Portfolio.

List of office holders

18th century
The Lord Somers, as part of the Townshend ministry
Henry Seymour Conway, as part of the Chatham ministry and Grafton ministry

19th century

20th century (first half)

20th century (second half)

21st century

See also
Minister without portfolio

References 

Ministerial offices in the United Kingdom
Lists of government ministers of the United Kingdom
Ministers without portfolio